Kenji Bahar is an American football quarterback for the Houston Gamblers of the United States Football League (USFL). He played college football at Monmouth University.

College career
Bahar was a member of the Monmouth Hawks for five seasons, redshirting his true freshman season. He was named second-team All-Big South Conference after passing for 2,626 yards and 20 touchdowns in his redshirt junior season. As a redshirt senior, he completed 289 of 448 passing attempts for 3,684 yards and 30 touchdowns with four rushing touchdowns and was named the Big South Offensive Player of the Year. Bahar set school records with 9,642 passing yards and 70 touchdown passes.

Professional career

Baltimore Ravens
Bahar signed with the Baltimore Ravens as an undrafted free agent on May 13, 2021. He was waived on June 4, but re-signed by the team on July 28, 2021, after Ravens starting quarterback Lamar Jackson was placed on the Reserve/Covid-19 list. Bahar was waived by the Ravens when Jackson was activated off the list on August 6, 2021. The Ravens re-signed Bahar again on August 16, 2021, after quarterback Trace McSorley suffered a back injury and was again waived on August 24, 2021. He was re-signed by the Ravens to their practice squad on November 23, 2021, and released on November 29, 2021. Bahar was re-signed to the practice squad on December 25, 2021, and was elevated to the active roster the following day for the Ravens' Week 16 game against the Cincinnati Bengals. He was released on December 28.

Houston Gamblers
Bahar was selected in the 12th round of the 2022 USFL Draft by the Houston Gamblers. He was transferred to the inactive roster on April 30, 2022, with a hand injury.

References

External links

Monmouth Hawks bio
Baltimore Ravens bio

Living people
Players of American football from Maryland
American football quarterbacks
Monmouth Hawks football players
Baltimore Ravens players
Houston Gamblers (2022) players
1997 births